Antiochus IX Eusebes Cyzicenus ("Antiochus the Pious, the Cyzicene") was a ruler of the Hellenistic Seleucid kingdom. He was the son of Antiochus VII Sidetes and Cleopatra Thea. He left the kingdom in 129 BC and went to the city of Cyzicus, but he returned in 116 BC to challenge his half-brother Antiochus VIII for power.

The siblings fought a twenty-year civil war. In 112 BC, Antiochus IX's wife, Cleopatra IV, was killed by her sister Tryphaena, the wife of Antiochus VIII. Tryphaena herself died shortly afterwards. Antiochus VIII was assassinated in 96 BC; he was succeeded by his sons Seleucus VI and Demetrius III. Antiochus IX then took the capital Antioch and married his deceased wife's sister Cleopatra Selene, who was herself the widow of Antiochus VIII. Seleucus VI continued the war against his uncle.  Antiochus IX Eusebes Cyzicenus was killed in battle in 96 B.C.

Biography

The son of Antiochus VII Sidetes and Cleopatra Thea, upon the death of his father in Parthia and his uncle Demetrius II Nicator's return to power (129 BC), his mother sent him to Cyzicus on the Bosporus, thus giving him his nickname.

Following the death of his mother c. 121 BC, Antiochus IX Cyzicenus challenged his half-brother, Antiochus VIII Grypus, for power over Syria.

He returned to Syria in 116 BC to claim the Seleucid throne from his half-brother/cousin Antiochus VIII Grypus, with whom he eventually divided Syria, that same year.

Antiochus IX Cyzicenus was first married to Cleopatra IV, who was said to have been killed in 112 BC by her sister and rival Tryphaena, wife of King Grypus. After the death of Grypus and Antiochus' capture of the capital, Antiochus married Cleopatra Selene of Syria, the sister of his former wife, Cleopatra IV.

He was subsequently killed in battle by the son of Grypus, Seleucus VI Epiphanes, later in 96 BC.

Legacy
Antiochus IX probably created the Iturean tetrarchy as an ally against Antiochus VIII.

See also

 List of Syrian monarchs
 Timeline of Syrian history

References

Sources

External links 

An engraved gem. Property of The Museum of Fine Arts, Boston. It probably depicts Antiochus IX.

2nd-century BC births
96 BC deaths
2nd-century BC Seleucid rulers
1st-century BC Seleucid rulers
Seleucid rulers
Monarchs killed in action
1st-century BC rulers in Asia
2nd-century BC rulers in Asia
Year of birth unknown
Kings of Syria